Adreano van den Driest (born 9 January 1992) is a Dutch footballer who last played for Dacia Unirea Brăila in Romania.

Career

Van den Driest started his senior career with NAC Breda. In 2013, he signed for Eindhoven in the Dutch Eerste Divisie, where he made six appearances and scored zero goals. After that, he played for Associação Académica de Coimbra – O.A.F., Académica Petróleos do Lobito, ENAD Polis Chrysochous, Achilles Veen, and ACS Dacia Unirea Brăila.

References

External links
 34,528 kilometers for a professional contract 
 Adventurer Van den Driest has finished roaming 
 Adventurer Van den Driest wants to deal with the past in Cyprus

1992 births
Living people
Footballers from Luanda
Dutch people of Angolan descent
Dutch footballers
Dutch expatriate footballers
Association football midfielders
NAC Breda players
FC Eindhoven players
Associação Académica de Coimbra – O.A.F. players
Académica Petróleos do Lobito players
AFC Dacia Unirea Brăila players
Achilles Veen players
Expatriate footballers in Romania
Expatriate footballers in Portugal
Expatriate footballers in Cyprus
Dutch expatriate sportspeople in Portugal
Dutch expatriate sportspeople in Cyprus
Dutch expatriate sportspeople in Romania
Liga II players